CALLUP is a global telecommunications company. Headquartered in Israel, CALLUP is a subsidiary of publicly traded One1 Group .

History

CALLUP was founded in 1999. The company began by providing services to telecom providers such as voicemail services. In 2000, it partnered with Unefón, Mexico's largest mobile phone operator. By 2003, CALLUP had entered into agreement with Unefón to supply 1.3 million of that company's subscribers with instant messaging service, a deal valued at $2.7 million. In 2005, CALLUP purchased Mediagate from Telrad Networks. The purchase expanded CALLUP's UMS, MMS, and SMS customers to approximately 5 million worldwide. Mediagate is recognized as the inventor of unified messaging and was one of CALLUP's main competitors prior to the purchase. In 2006, it earned one of its largest projects when it partnered with the German conglomerate Siemens.

CALLUP expanded to approximately 20 employees in 2008 with earnings of approximately $3 million. The same year, it purchased Vimatix, a provider for mobile. The purchase allowed CALLUP to expand its mobile operations using Vimatix's platforms including multimedia content delivery in 2.5G and 3G networks.

In 2012, CALLUP added former VocalTec and Comverse Technology executive Alon Roth to its executive team.  In 2014, the company launched CanVAS in the Cloud, a set of cloud-based value added services for mobile providers. In the same year, CALLUP entered into an agreement with Hot Mobile and YouPhone  to provide its over the air technology through its SIM OTA platform. In 2015 it was also selected by a major cellular operator in a European country.

References

Telecommunications companies of Israel
Companies established in 1999
Companies based in Tel Aviv
Information technology companies of Israel
1999 establishments in Israel